Freitas e Vila Cova is a civil parish in the northern Portuguese municipality of Fafe, in the district of Braga.

History

It was formed in 2013 through the merger of the former-parishes of Freitas and Vila Cova.

Architecture

Civic
 Freitas Primary School )

Religious
 Chapel of Santa Marinha
 Chapel of Santo António

References

Freguesias of Fafe